Tower City may refer to:
 Tower City, Pennsylvania
 Tower City, North Dakota
 Tower City Center, a retail, office, and transportation complex in downtown Cleveland, Ohio
 Tower City station